Sosrobahu is a road construction technique which allows long stretches of flyovers to be constructed above existing major roads with minimum disruption to traffic. The technique was designed and invented by Indonesian engineer Tjokorda Raka Sukawati and involves the construction of the horizontal supports for the highway beside the existing road, which are then lifted and turned 90 degrees before being placed on the top of the vertical supports to form the flyover pylons.

This technique is of considerable value in increasing road mileage in large cities where there is limited right-of-way for new roads and the closure of existing roads throughout the flyover's construction using normal techniques would impose significant economic costs. The term sosrobahu was derived from Old Javanese which means "thousand shoulders".

Background
By the 1980s, Jakarta was experiencing increased traffic congestion, and flyovers were seen as one solution to the improving transport infrastructure. One construction company operating at that time was PT Hutama Karya, which was granted a contract to build a highway above Jalan A. Yani, an extremely important stretch of highway where it was vital that the road would continue to be open to traffic throughout the period of construction.

In addition to this challenge, PT Hutama Karya were also granted a contract to build a flyover between Cawang and Tanjung Priok in 1987. The erection of the pier shafts was not difficult; what caused problems were the poured concrete pier heads. With conventional construction techniques, the pier heads would be moved into place with the help of iron supports beneath the outspread pier heads, but the use of iron supports would necessitate the closure of the road below. Another option was to support the pier heads from above, but this increased the costs of the project.

In response to these problems, Tjokorda had the idea of initially erecting the concrete pier shafts and then building the poured concrete pier heads in the centre lane, parallel to the existing roadway, and then raising and turning the pier heads 90 degrees into place. The only problem with this idea was that the pier heads weigh approximately 480 tonnes each.

Inspiration from a hydraulic car-jack
One day Tjokorda was working on his 1974 Mercedes-Benz, which he had jacked up so that the back two wheels were supported on the slippery floor of the garage where some oil had been accidentally spilled. When the car was pushed, it pivoted with the jack as the axis. He noted that it is a principle of physics that when friction is banished it is easy to move even the heaviest of objects.

This event inspired the realization that a hydraulic pump could be used to lift heavy objects and, as long as they were supported by something slippery, the heavy objects could be easily moved. Tjokorda's goal was to lift and move concrete pier heads each weighing 480 tonnes.

Tjokorda conducted trials with cylinders 20 cm in diameter converted into a hydraulic lift and loaded with 80 tonnes of concrete. The weight was successfully lifted and turned slightly, but could not then be lowered as the position of the hydraulic jack had shifted. Tjokorda then made some improvements on the original design, and in subsequent lifts the hydraulic jack stayed stable even with the full weight of the concrete above it.

Other problems to be overcome included establishing the best type of oil to use that would not lose its viscosity. The type of oil was a critical factor because it was the oil which transmitted the force required to lift the heavy concrete pier heads.

After the trials, Tjokorda finalised his design called the LBPH (the Indonesian acronym for Free Moving Platform) which consisted of two concrete discs with a diameter of 80 cm enclosed in a container. Although only 5 cm thick, the discs are capable of supporting a weight of 625 tonnes each.

Between the two plates is pumped lubricating oil. A rubber seal around the edges of the plates protected against the oil escaping under the high forces experienced during the lift. The oil in the container was connected to a hydraulic pump through a small pipe. This hydraulic system was capable of lifting loads using a pressure of 78 kgf/cm² (7.6 MPa), although the reasons for this were a mystery to Tjokorda at that time.

Field trials
The new technique had not yet been trialled because of time constraints, however Tjokorda was certain that it would work and was willing to bear the responsibility should the concrete pier heads not be able to be turned 90 degrees as required for the construction of the flyover.

On 27 July 1988 at 22:00 Jakarta time, the hydraulic pump was pressurized to 78 kgf/cm² (7.6 MPa). The pier head, despite lack of iron supports, was lifted and placed on top of the pier shaft and then with a light push was turned 90 degrees into its final position. The oil was then slowly pumped out and the pier head was lowered onto the shaft. The LPBH system was then shut down as it required heavy machinery to move it. Because he was worried that the single pier shaft and head might shift for a lack of support, he propped them up with eight concrete supports, 3.6 m in diameter. The LPBH was then used to raise the other pier heads over their respective shafts.

Naming the technique and the granting of a patent
In November 1989, President Soeharto of Indonesia gave the name Sosrobahu to the new technology. The name was taken from a character in the Ramayana, and derives from Old Javanese for 'thousand shoulders'.

 Tjokorda himself wanted to investigate further the limits of his invention and built himself a laboratory where he successfully tested the LPBH to a limit of 78.05 kgf/cm² (7.654 MPa).

Patents have been granted for the invention from Indonesia, Japan, Malaysia, and the Philippines, and has been applied for in South Korea. The Indonesian patent was granted in 1995, while the Japanese patent was granted in 1992. The technology has been exported to the Philippines, Malaysia, Thailand and Singapore. The longest stretch of overpass built using this technique is in Metro Manila, Philippines at the Metro Manila Skyway located at the southern part of the metropolis. In the Philippines, 298 supports have been erected, while in Kuala Lumpur, the figure is 135. When the technology was introduced to the Philippines, the President of the Philippines, Fidel Ramos commented: "This is an Indonesian invention, but is also an ASEAN invention".

A second version of the technology has been developed. Whereas the first version used a steel anchor inserted in a concrete base, the second version uses a single plate with a hole in the middle which is not only simpler, but also significantly speeds up the time it takes to erect a pylon from 2 days to 45 minutes. It is expected that the lifespan of flyovers constructed using the Sosrobahu method will be approximately 100 years.

According to Dr. Drajat Hoedajanto, an expert from the Bandung Institute of Technology, Sosrobahu is a very simple solution to the problem of erecting flyover pylons and is suitable for use in the construction of elevated toll roads which have traffic running underneath them.

References

Further reading
"Sosrobahu Bertumpu di Atas Piring", Gatra, 21 August 2004; in Indonesian, requests payment

External links
About Sosrobahu
About Tjokorda Raka Sukawati and Sosrobahu; in Indonesian
Video on Sosrobahu rotation 

Hydraulic tools
Road construction
Science and technology in Indonesia
Indonesian inventions